Mimanhammus enganensis is a species of beetle in the family Cerambycidae, and the only species in the genus Mimanhammus. It was described by Breuning in 1971.

References

Lamiini
Beetles described in 1971